State Road 472 (NM 472) is a  state highway in the US state of New Mexico. NM 472's western terminus is at NM 344 north of Edgewood, and the eastern terminus is at NM 41 in Stanley.

Major intersections

See also

References

472
Transportation in Santa Fe County, New Mexico